SR 3 may refer to:

 SR-3 Vikhr, a Russian assault rifle
 SR-3 Blackstar, the first stage of a reported American covert spaceplane program 
 Matich SR3, an Australian sports car
 Radical SR3, an English sports car
 Saints Row: The Third, a video game
 Szekely SR-3, an aircraft engine
 State Road 3 or State Route 3; see List of highways numbered 3
 The third iteration of Solar Roadways' panels, and the first to be publicly installed
 VR Class Sr3, a Finnish electric locomotive
 SR3 (album), an album by K.O